OGLE-2005-BLG-071L is a distant, magnitude 19.5 galactic bulge star located in the constellation Scorpius, approximately 11,000 light years away from the Solar System. The star is probably a red dwarf with a mass 43% of that of the Sun.

Planetary system
In 2005 an exoplanet was discovered orbiting this star by the microlensing method, the second planet found by this method.  The planet was later confirmed by the Keck telescope and its properties were refined.

See also 
 List of extrasolar planets
 Optical Gravitational Lensing Experiment or OGLE

References

External links
 

M-type main-sequence stars
Scorpius (constellation)
Planetary systems with one confirmed planet
Gravitational lensing